Wisconsin Sports Network was a short-lived regional sports network that served the state of Wisconsin. The network was created in 1996 when Westinghouse Broadcasting (Group W) gained broadcast rights to both the Milwaukee Bucks and Milwaukee Brewers.

History
The Bucks games were first broadcast in January 1996 under the name Bucks Network, but the name was changed to Wisconsin Sports Network a few months later once the broadcast rights to the Brewers were obtained. 25 Brewers games were carried during the 1996 season. When not broadcasting live games, the schedule was filled with programming from NewSport. In 1997, Midwest Sports Channel (owned by CBS, which had just purchased Westinghouse) assumed responsibility for producing and distributing games on the network. The network briefly became known as the Wisconsin Sports Channel before being folded into Midwest Sports Channel at the end of the year.

References

Westinghouse Broadcasting
Television channels and stations established in 1996
Television channels and stations disestablished in 1997
Fox Sports Networks